Gördes is a town and district of Manisa Province in the Aegean region of Turkey. According to the 2000 census, population of the district is 38,110 of which 10,809 live in the town of Gördes.

History
Gördes has been held by the Persians, Macedonians, Roman and Byzantine empires, and in 1071AD passed to the Turks. From 1867 until 1922, Gördes was part of the Aidin Vilayet of the Ottoman Empire.

Economy
Gördes is one of the handmade Turkish carpet production centers in Manisa. Gördes carpets have different pattern and styles. See: Ghiordes knot.

Gordes district  is linked to the neighboring districts.  The main source  income is tobacco and poppy production and wheat, barley is grown.  In recent years production of cherries, strawberries has begun production 
Other crops include potatoes, peas, tomatoes and cucumbers  and wine.

In addition, olive, quince and persimmon cultivation are also carried out in Gördes.

The area has mining with Coal and Zeolite being the main deposits but kaolin, nickel-iron, titanium, zeolite beds are also available.  In addition, feldspar, marble, kyanite, chalcedony, chrome, quartz, boron is among mined in the region.

See also
Gordium

Notes

References

External links
 District municipality's official website 
 Road map of Gördes and environs
 Various images of Gördes, Manisa

Ancient Greek archaeological sites in Turkey
Roman sites in Turkey
Populated places in Manisa Province
Districts of Manisa Province